Parolulis is a genus of moths of the family Erebidae.

Taxonomy
The genus has previously been classified in the subfamily Calpinae of the family Noctuidae.

Species
Parolulis olivescens Hampson, 1907
Parolulis renalis Moore, 1885

References

Natural History Museum Lepidoptera genus database

Boletobiinae
Noctuoidea genera